Asam pedas (Minangkabau: asam padeh; "sour and spicy") is a Maritime Southeast Asian sour and spicy fish stew dish. Asam pedas is believed to come from Minangkabau cuisine of West Sumatra, Indonesia and has spread throughout to the islands of Sumatra (inc. Riau, Jambi, South Sumatra), Borneo (West Kalimantan) and Malay Peninsula.

Region

The spicy and sour fish dish is endemic in the Malay archipelago, known widely in Sumatra, Borneo and Malay Peninsula. It is part of the culinary heritage of both Minangkabau and also Malay traditions. The Minang asam padeh can be easily found throughout Padang restaurants in Indonesia, Malaysia and Singapore.

It has become a typical cuisine of Malays from eastern shores of Sumatra—Jambi, Riau, Riau Islands, and as far north in Aceh and across the Straits of Malacca in Johore, Malacca, Singapore, and also coastal Borneo, especially Pontianak in West Kalimantan. The spice mixture and the fish used might be slightly different according to the area.

Preparation

The main ingredients in asam pedas are usually seafood or freshwater fish. They are cooked in asam (tamarind) fruit juice with chilli and spices.

The cooking process involves soaking the pulp of the tamarind fruit until it is soft and then squeezing out the juice for cooking the fish. Asam paste may be substituted for convenience. Vegetables such as terong or brinjals (Indian eggplants), okra and tomatoes are added.

Fish and seafood—such as mackerel, mackerel tuna, tuna, skipjack tuna, red snapper, gourami, pangasius, hemibagrus or cuttlefish — either the whole body or sometimes only the fish heads are added to make a spicy and tart fish stew. It is important that the fish remain intact for serving so generally the fish is added last.

In Indonesia, the most common fish used in asam pedas is tongkol (mackerel tuna). In Lingga, the dish is preferrably served with sago griddle cakes (lempeng sagu) in place of rice usual in other places.

Kaeng som is the Thai version of asam pedas. In Bengal, India there is a similar dish is called Macher tak (sour fish).

See also

 Pindang
 Fish stew
 List of fish dishes
 List of stews

References 

Padang cuisine
Malay cuisine
Indonesian cuisine
Indonesian stews
Singaporean cuisine
Fish stews